Rampal Union is a Union Parishad under Rampal Upazila of Bagerhat District in the division of Khulna, Bangladesh. It has an area of 33.23 km2 (12.83 sq mi) and a population of 27,353.

References

Unions of Rampal Upazila
Unions of Bagerhat District
Unions of Khulna Division